Commander-captain or commanding captain is a naval rank, used in a number of navies, including all Scandinavian nations. The rank is rated OF-4 within NATO forces.

Scandinavia

Denmark
On 11 February 1693, the rank was codified, by King Christian V, with the publication of the updated Danish order of precedence. As of 2022, the rank is placed below  and above . It has the grade of M401 within the Ministry of Defence's pay structure. Officially translated the rank is called "Commander, senior grade".

Norway

Sweden

Gallery

References

Naval ranks
Captains
da:Kommandørkaptajn
fi:Komentajakapteeni
no:Kommandørkaptein
sv:Kommendörkapten